Henrik Hetta (born 17 August 1989) is a Swedish former professional ice hockey player.

Playing career
Hetta began his professional career with Östersunds IK in the Swedish Division 1, the third tier of professional hockey in Sweden.

In 2011-12 he played for Malmö Redhawks head coach Mats Lusth with the Division 1 club Olofströms IK Hetta played well for Lusth at the time and when Lusth moved to Malmö in 2012–13 Hetta was offered a tryout contract by the Redhawks.  Hetta was successful with his tryout contract and was offered a two-year contract by Malmö which was signed January 4, 2013.

Hetta played two seasons with Skellefteå AIK in the SHL before leaving as a free agent following the 2017–18 season. On 8 May 2018, Hetta opted to return for a second tenure with the Malmö Redhawks, agreeing to a two-year contract.

Career Statistics

References

External links

1989 births
Living people
Asplöven HC players
Malmö Redhawks players
Olofströms IK players
Skellefteå AIK players
Swedish ice hockey left wingers
VIK Västerås HK players